Ryan Brown (born January 2, 1975) is an American actor, known for his portrayal of Bill Lewis III on Guiding Light from 1998 to 2001 and Billy Abbott on The Young and the Restless from 2002 to 2003. He is also the author of the novel Play Dead which was published in 2010.

Biography

Education
Ryan Brown graduated the University of Oklahoma in 1997, with a degree in film studies.  After graduating, he moved to New York, where he went on to study theatre at The American Academy of Dramatic Arts.

Career
Within months of arriving in New York City, he was cast in the role of Bill Lewis on the CBS Daytime Drama, Guiding Light - a role he would play for the next three years.  After getting married, he and his wife moved to Los Angeles, where Ryan soon landed the role of Billy Abbott on CBS's The Young and the Restless.  Following his tenure on The Young and the Restless, he returned to New York and continued working as an actor, appearing on Law & Order: Special Victims Unit, and Inspector Mom. He has also starred in the films Sam & Janet and You Bet Your Life.

Suspended is a short story that is featured in FIRST THRILLS (Tor/Forge June 2010), an anthology, edited by Lee Child. Another short story written by Brown is Jeepers Peepers and is a young adult thriller, which is featured in FEAR: 13 STORIES OF SUSPENSE AND HORROR, edited by R.L. Stine.

Personal life
He is the son of author Sandra Brown & Michael Brown, an award-winning video producer. It was on the set of Guiding Light that Ryan met his future wife, Victoria Arbiter and they have been married since December 15, 2001. The two have a son, Dylan Rafferty, born August 1, 2003.

Filmography

Television

Films

Bibliography

Short Stories

 Suspended (June 2010)
 Jeepers Peepers (September 2010)

Novels
 Play Dead (May 2010)

External links
 
 Ryan Brown's website

1975 births
Male actors from Texas
American male soap opera actors
American male television actors
Living people
People from Tyler, Texas
University of Oklahoma alumni